Several presidents of the United States have appeared on currency. The president of the United States has appeared on official banknotes, coins for circulation, and commemorative coins in the United States, the Confederate States of America, the Philippine Islands, the Commonwealth of the Philippines and around the world.

United States 
Note: Series dates listed for United States paper money represents a specific issue or set of issues. Different series may represent minor or major design changes, or no design change (series listed on the same line). Only a variety of a president's portrait used on paper money is noted next to the series date.

Twenty-three U.S. presidents have appeared on U.S. coin and paper currency. By law, "only the portrait of a deceased individual may appear on United States currency". The Secretary of the Treasury usually determines which people and which of their portraits appear on the nation's currency, however legislation passed by Congress can also determine currency design. Presidents appearing on U.S. currency are (in order of service):

George Washington

Early coinage 
 1783, 1792 Washington piece
 1783, 1791, 1792, 1795 Washington cent
 Washington double-head cent
 1791 Washington Liverpool halfpenny
 1792 Washington Getz pattern piece
 1793, 1795 Washington halfpenny
 1795 Washington halfpenny, grate token
 1795 Washington North Wales halfpenny
 Success Medal

Five cents 
 1866, 1909, and 1910 Washington nickel pattern pieces

Quarter dollars 
 1932, 1934–1998 Washington quarter (obverse).  The reverse carried a heraldic eagle for all years except 1975 and 1976, which featured the dual date 1776–1976 on the obverse and special reverse design for the United States Bicentennial.
 1999–2008 50 State quarters Series (obverse)
 1999 New Jersey state quarter (reverse) (Washington Crossing the Delaware)
 2006 South Dakota state quarter (reverse) (Mount Rushmore)
 2009 District of Columbia and United States Territories quarters
 2010–present America the Beautiful quarters
 2013 South Dakota ATB quarter (reverse) (Mount Rushmore)
2021 50 State quarters (obverse). Washington Crossing the Delaware River

Dollar coins 
 2007 Presidential dollar coin (obverse), 1st of four U.S. presidents issued in 2007.

Commemorative coins 

 1900 commemorative silver Lafayette dollar
 1926 commemorative half dollar – 150th anniversary of the signing of the Declaration of Independence
 1982 commemorative half dollar – 250th anniversary of Washington's birth
 1991 Mount Rushmore commemorative series
 Half dollar
 Silver dollar
 $5 gold piece
 1999 $5 gold commemorative piece – 200th anniversary of Washington's death; an alternate design not chosen for the 1932 Washington quarter
 2008 $10 Gold Coin, First Spouse Program, Dolley Madison, (reverse)

Banknotes 
 Compound Interest Treasury Note
 $100 (with a vignette of George Washington standing)
 $500
 Interest Bearing Note
 $1000

 Fractional currency
 10¢ and 50¢ first issues
 5¢, 10¢, 25¢, and 50¢ second issue
 3¢, and 10¢ third issue
 25¢ fourth issue
 United States Note
 $1 Series of 1869
 $1 Series of 1874, 1875 A—E, 1878
 $1 Series of 1880
 $1 Series of 1917
 $1 Series of 1923

 Silver certificate
 $1 Series of 1896 "Educational Series" (portrait on back)
 $1 Series of 1923
 $1 Series of 1928
 $1 Series of 1934, A—E
 $1 Series 1935, A—H
 $1 Series 1957, A—B
 $2 Series of 1899
 National Banknotes
 $5 Series of 1882
Blue seal
Washington on reverse

 Gold Certificate
 $20 Series of 1905 (with reversed left-facing instead of right-facing portrait)
 $20 Series of 1906 (with reversed left-facing instead of right-facing portrait)
 $20 Series of 1922 (with reversed left-facing instead of right-facing portrait)
 Federal Reserve Bank Note
$1 Series of 1918
 Federal Reserve Note
All $1 Federal Reserve Notes since Series 1963

John Adams 
Coin for circulation

 2007 Dollar (obverse), 2nd of four U.S. presidents issued in 2007.

Banknotes

 National Bank Notes
 All $100 first charter period (on back in the engraved version of the painting Declaration of Independence by [[John Trumbull
 Federal Reserve Notes
 All $2 (on back in the engraved version of Trumbull's Declaration of Independence painting)

Thomas Jefferson

Coins for circulation

Five cents 
 1938–1942, 1946–2003 (copper-nickel) nickel with Monticello on the reverse
 1942–1945 (35% silver) nickel; wartime composition.  The mint mark for these types are located above the Monticello.  It helps distinguish between the 1942 types.
 2004 nickel Westward Journey Series
 Louisiana Purchase
 Lewis and Clark
 2005 nickel Westward Journey Series
 American bison (similar to pre-Jefferson buffalo nickel reverse)
 "Ocean in view! O! The Joy!" (quote by William Clark)
 2006—present nickel "Return to Monticello" with a forward-facing Jefferson and the Monticello returns on the reverse.

Quarter dollar 
 2006 South Dakota state quarter reverse (Mount Rushmore)

Dollar 
 2007 Dollar (obverse), 3rd of four U.S. presidents issued in 2007.

Commemorative coins 
 1903 commemorative gold dollar – issued for the Louisiana Purchase Exposition
 1991 Mount Rushmore commemorative series
 Half dollar
 Silver dollar
 $5 gold piece
 1993 commemorative silver dollar – 250th anniversary of Jefferson's birth

Banknotes 
 Fractional currency
 5¢ and 25¢ first issue

 United States Note
 $2 Series of 1869
 $2 Series of 1874, 1875, 1878
 $2 Series of 1880
 $2 Series of 1917
 $2 Series of 1928, A—G
 $2 Series 1953, A—C
 $2 Series 1963, A

 Federal Reserve Bank Note
 $2 Series of 1918
 Federal Reserve Note
 All $2 Federal Reserve Notes since Series 1976 appearing on front and reverse.

James Madison 

Coin for circulation

 2007 Dollar (obverse), 4th of four U.S. presidents issued in 2007.

Commemorative coins

 1993 Bill of Rights commemorative coin series
 Half dollar
 Silver dollar
 $5 gold piece
$500000 gold ingot

Banknotes

 

 United States Note
 $5000 1878 (no series date)
 Gold Certificate
 $5000 Series of 1870 and 1875
 $5000 1882 [DEPARTMENT SERIES]
 $5000 Series of 1888
 $5000 Series of 1882
 $5000 Series of 1928
 Federal Reserve Note
 $5000 Series of 1914
 All $5000 small size Federal Reserve Notes

James Monroe 

Coins for circulation

 2008 Dollar (obverse), 1st of four U.S. presidents issued in 2008.

Commemorative coin

 1923 Monroe Doctrine Centennial half dollar, featuring profiles of Monroe

John Quincy Adams 
Coins for circulation

 2008 Dollar (obverse), 2nd of four U.S. presidents issued in 2008.

Commemorative coin

 1923 Monroe Doctrine Centennial half dollar, featuring profiles of Adams and James Monroe

Banknotes

 United States Note
 $500 Series of 1869

Andrew Jackson 
Coins for circulation

 2008 Dollar (obverse), (released August 14, 2008) 3rd of four U.S. presidents issued in 2008.

Banknotes

 United States Note
 $5 Series of 1869
 $5 Series of 1875, 1878
 $5 Series of 1880
 $5 Series of 1907
 $10 Series of 1923
 $10,000 1878 (no series date)
 Gold Certificate
 $20 Series of 1928
 $10,000 Series of 1870 and 1875
 $10,000 1882 [DEPARTMENT SERIES]
 $10,000 Series of 1888
 $10,000 Series of 1900
 Federal Reserve Bank Note
 $10 Series of 1915
 $10 Series of 1918
 $20 Series of 1929
 National Bank Note
 $20 Series of 1929
 Federal Reserve Note
 $10 Series of 1914
 All $20 small size Federal Reserve Notes
 Series of 1928–1995
 Series 1996–2003 (with redesigned enlarged portrait)
 Series 2004–2006 (with redesigned enlarged portrait)
 Series 2020 (moved to backside, Harriet Tubman on frontside)

Martin Van Buren 
Coins for circulation

 2008 Dollar (obverse), (released November 13, 2008) 4th of four U.S. presidents issued in 2008.

William H. Harrison 
Coins for circulation

 2009 Dollar (obverse), 1st of four U.S. presidents issued in 2009.

John Tyler 
Coins for circulation

 2009 Dollar (obverse), 2nd of four U.S. presidents to be issued in 2009.

James K. Polk 
Coins for circulation

 2009 Dollar (obverse), (released on August 20, 2009) 3rd of four U.S. presidents issued in 2009.

Zachary Taylor 
Coins for circulation

 2009 Dollar (obverse), (released November 19, 2009) 4th of four U.S. presidents issued in 2009.

Millard Fillmore 
Coins for circulation

 2010 Dollar (obverse), 1st of four U.S. presidents issued in 2010.

Franklin Pierce 
Coins for circulation

 2010 Dollar (obverse), 2nd of four U.S. presidents issued in 2010.

James Buchanan 
Coins for circulation

 2010 Dollar (obverse), 3rd of four U.S. presidents issued in 2010.

Abraham Lincoln

Coins for circulation

One cent 
 19091942, 19441958 (95% copper, 5% zinc and tin) Wheat Ears cent a.k.a. "Wheat penny"
 1943 (zinc-plated steel) Wheat cent
 19591962 (95% copper, 5% zinc and tin ) Lincoln Memorial cent
 1963-mid 1982 (95% copper, 5% zinc ) Lincoln Memorial cent
 1974 (aluminum) Lincoln Memorial Cent
 1982–2008 (copper-plated zinc) Lincoln Memorial cent
 2009 Lincoln bicentennial of birth commemorative cent series, four different designs on reverse 
Birth and early childhood in Kentucky
Formative years in Indiana
Professional life in Illinois
Presidency in Washington, D.C.
 2010–present (copper-plated zinc) Shield Penny

Quarter dollar 
 2003 Illinois state quarter reverse "Land of Lincoln"
 2006 South Dakota state quarter reverse (Mount Rushmore)

Dollar 
 2010 Dollar (obverse), 4th of four U.S. presidents issued in 2010.

Commemorative coins 

 1918 commemorative half dollar – Illinois 100th statehood anniversary
 1991 Mount Rushmore commemorative coin series
 Half dollar
 Silver dollar
 $5 gold piece
 2009 Silver dollar commemorating Lincoln's 200th anniversary of birth (Gettysburg Address)

Banknotes 

 $10 Demand Note
 $20 Compound Interest Treasury Note
 $20 Interest Bearing Note
 Fractional currency
 50¢ fourth issue (with left-facing portrait)

 United States Note
 $5 Series of 1928, A—F
 $5 Series 1953, A—C
 $5 Series 1963
 $10 Act of 1862 and 1863
 $100 Series of 1869
 $100 Series of 1875, 1878
 $100 Series of 1880
 Gold Certificate
 $500 Series of 1882
 $500 Series of 1922

 Silver certificate
 $1 Series of 1899
 $5 Series of 1923
 $5 Series of 1934 A—D
 $5 Series 1953 A—C
 Federal Reserve Bank Note
 $5 Series of 1915
 $5 Series of 1918
 $5 Series of 1929
 National Bank Note
 $5 Series of 1929

 Federal Reserve Note
 $5 Series of 1914
 All small size $5 Federal Reserve Notes
 Series of 1928—Series 1995
 Series 1996—2003A (with redesigned enlarged portrait)

Andrew Johnson 
Coins for circulation

 2011 Dollar (obverse), 1st of four U.S. presidents issued in 2011.

Ulysses S. Grant 

Coins for circulation

 2011 Dollar (obverse), 2nd of four U.S. presidents issued in 2011.

Commemorative coins

 1922 commemorative half dollar – 100th anniversary of Grant's birth
 1922 commemorative gold dollar – 100th anniversary of Grant's birth

Banknotes

 Silver certificate
 $1 Series of 1899 (with small left-facing instead of right-facing portrait)
 $5 1886 DEPARTMENT SERIES
 $5 Series of 1891
 $5 Series of 1896 "Educational Series" (portrait on back)
 Gold Certificate
 $50 Series of 1913
 $50 Series of 1922
 Federal Reserve Bank Note
 $50 Series of 1918 issued only by the St. Louis Federal Reserve Bank
 $50 Series of 1929
 National Bank Note
 $50 Series of 1929
 Federal Reserve Note
 $50 Series of 1914
 All $50 small size Federal Reserve Notes
 Series of 1928—Series 1995
 Series 1996–2003 (with redesigned larger portrait)
 Series 2004A (with redesigned larger portrait)

Rutherford B. Hayes 
Coins for circulation

 2011 Dollar (obverse), 3rd of four U.S. presidents issued in 2011.

James A. Garfield 

Coins for circulation

 2011 Dollar (obverse), 4th of four U.S. presidents issued in 2011.

Banknotes

 National Bank Notes
 All $5 second charter period
 Gold Certificate
 $20 Series of 1882

Chester A. Arthur 
Coins for circulation

 2012 Dollar (obverse), 1st of four U.S. presidents issued in 2012.

Grover Cleveland 
Coins for circulation

 2012 Dollar (obverse), 2nd of four U.S. presidents issued in 2012.
 2012 Dollar (obverse), 4th of four U.S. presidents issued in 2012.

Banknotes

 Federal Reserve Note
 $20 Series of 1914
 All $1000 small size Federal Reserve Notes
 Gold Certificate
 $1000 Series of 1928
 $1000 Series of 1934

Benjamin Harrison 

Coins for circulation

 2012 Dollar (obverse), 3rd of four U.S. presidents issued in 2012.

Banknotes

 National Bank Notes
 All $5 third charter period

William McKinley 
Commemorative coins

 1903 commemorative gold dollar – issued for the Louisiana Purchase Exposition
 1916 and 1917 commemorative dollar – commemorate McKinley's death

Banknotes

 National Bank Notes
 All $10 third charter period
 Gold Certificate
 $500 Series of 1928
 Federal Reserve Notes
 All $500 small size
Coins for circulation
 2013 Dollar (obverse), 1st of four U.S. presidents issued in 2013.

Theodore Roosevelt 

Coins for circulation

 2006 South Dakota state quarter (Mount Rushmore)
 2013 Dollar (obverse), 2nd of four U.S. presidents issued in 2013.
 2016 Quarter Dollar (reverse), 4th of five America's National Park Commemorative Quarters to be issued later in the year.

Commemorative coins

 1991 Mount Rushmore commemorative coin series
 Half dollar
 Silver dollar
 $5 gold piece

William Howard Taft 
Coins for circulation

 2013 Dollar (obverse), 3rd of four U.S. presidents issued in 2013.

Woodrow Wilson 

Banknotes

 Gold Certificate
 $100,000 Series of 1934

Coins for circulation

 2013 Dollar (obverse), 4th of four U.S. presidents issued in 2013.

Warren G. Harding 
Coins for circulation

 2014 Dollar (obverse), 1st of four U.S. presidents issued in 2014.

Calvin Coolidge 

Commemorative coin

 1926 commemorative half dollar – 150th anniversary of the signing of theDeclaration of Independence
 2014 Dollar (obverse), 2nd of four U.S. presidents issued in 2014.

Herbert Hoover 
Commemorative coin

 2014 Dollar (obverse), 3rd of four U.S. presidents issued in 2014.

Franklin D. Roosevelt 
Coins for circulation

 19461964 (90% silver) dime
 1965present (copper-nickel) dime

Commemorative coins

 1997 $5 gold commemorative coin
 2014 Dollar (obverse), 4th of four U.S. presidents issued in 2014.

Harry S. Truman 
Coins for circulation

 2015 Dollar (obverse), 1st of four U.S. presidents issued in 2015.

Dwight D. Eisenhower 

Coins for circulation

 19711978 Eisenhower Dollar coin.  The reverse only changed in 1975 and 1976 when the double dated coins showing 1776–1976 were minted to celebrate the U.S. Bicentennial.
 2015 Dollar (obverse), 2nd of four U.S. presidents issued in 2015.

Commemorative coins

 1990 Eisenhower commemorative dollar100th anniversary of Eisenhower's birth

John F. Kennedy 

Coins for circulation

 1964 (90% silver) half dollar (silver proofs from 1992–present also have this composition)
 1965–1970 half dollar (40% silver)
 1971–present half dollar (copper-nickel) The reverse only changed in 1975 and 1976 when the double dated coins showing 1776–1976 were minted to celebrate the U.S. Bicentennial.
 2015 Dollar (obverse), 3rd of four U.S. presidents, issued in 2015.

Lyndon B. Johnson 
Coins for circulation

 2015 Dollar (obverse), 4th of four U.S. presidents issued in 2015.

Richard Nixon 
Coins for circulation

 2016 Dollar (obverse), 1st of three U.S. presidents issued in 2016.

Gerald Ford 
Coins for circulation

 2016 Dollar (obverse), 2nd of three U.S. presidents issued in 2016.

Ronald Reagan 
Coins for circulation

 2016 Dollar (obverse), 3rd of three U.S. presidents issued in 2016.

George H. W. Bush  
Coins for circulation

 2020 Dollar (obverse)

Presidential dollar coin series 

 2007 – George Washington, John Adams, Thomas Jefferson, James Madison
 2008 – James Monroe, John Quincy Adams, Andrew Jackson, Martin Van Buren
 2009 – William Henry Harrison, John Tyler, James K. Polk, Zachary Taylor
 2010 – Millard Fillmore, Franklin Pierce, James Buchanan, Abraham Lincoln
 2011 – Andrew Johnson, Ulysses S. Grant, Rutherford B. Hayes, James A. Garfield
 2012 – Chester A. Arthur, Grover Cleveland, Benjamin Harrison,  Grover Cleveland
 2013 – William McKinley, Theodore Roosevelt, William Howard Taft, Woodrow Wilson
 2014 – Warren G. Harding, Calvin Coolidge, Herbert Hoover, Franklin D. Roosevelt
 2015 – Harry S. Truman, Dwight D. Eisenhower, John F. Kennedy, Lyndon B. Johnson
 2016 – Richard Nixon, Gerald Ford, Ronald Reagan.
 2020 – George H. W. Bush
 Note: The remaining presidents (Jimmy Carter, Bill Clinton, George W. Bush, Barack Obama, Donald Trump, Joe Biden) are not eligible to be honored because they are still alive

Confederate States of America

Andrew Jackson 
 $1000 1861 Montgomery, Alabama note, with Jackson's first vice president, John C. Calhoun at left.

George Washington 
 $50 1861 (Washington at left, and allegories at right and center)
 $50 July 25, 1861, 1862 (Washington at center and allegory at left)
 $100 July 25, 1861, 1862
State issues 
 $1 Louisiana, 1864
 $2 Tallahassee, Florida, 1861
 $3 Tallahassee, Florida, 1861
 $5 Treasury Warrant note for military service, Texas, 1862
 $20 Virginia, 1861
 $100 Virginia, 1862
 $1,000 Confederate States of America note is one of 607 issued and features images of John C. Calhoun on the left and Andrew Jackson on the right. Almost all of the Montgomery issued notes were signed by hand by Alex B. Clitherall, Register, and E.C. Elmore, Treasurer,1861

Philippine Islands, Commonwealth of the Philippines, Republic of the Philippines

William McKinley 
 5 Peso Series of 1903 and 1910 Silver Certificate
 5 Peso Series of 1916, and 1921 Philippine National Bank Circulating Note
 5 Peso Series of 1937 Philippine National Bank Circulating Note (with Commonwealth Seal in red)
 5 Peso Series of 1918 and 1924 Treasury Certificate (large portrait)
 5 Peso Series of 1937 Philippine National Bank Circulating Note (with Commonwealth Seal in red)
 5 Peso Series of 1929, 1936, 1941, and "Victory" Series No. 66 Treasury Certificate (with small portrait at left coincide with Admiral George Dewey, starting 1936 it had the seal of the Commonwealth in red and in the "Victory" Series No. 66 in blue)

Ronald Reagan 
 25 Piso 1982, silver coin, (portrait with President Marcos), KM#235
 25 Piso 1986, silver coin, commemorating President Aquino's visit to Washington, KM#246
 2500 Piso 1986, gold coin, commemorating President Aquino's visit to Washington, KM#247

Franklin D. Roosevelt 
 1 Peso 1936, silver coin, Establishment of Commonwealth (portrait with President Quezon), KM#177

George Washington 
 10 Peso Series of 1903 and 1912 Silver Certificate
 10 Peso Series of 1916 and 1921 Philippine National Bank Circulating Note
 5 Peso Series of 1937 Philippine National Bank Circulating Note (with Commonwealth Seal in red)
 10 Peso Series of 1918 and 1924 Treasury Certificate (with small portrait similar to modern U.S. $1 bill)
 10 Peso Series of 1929, 1936, 1941, and "Victory" Series No. 66 Treasury Certificate (with right-facing portrait similar to 1999 $5 commemorative gold coin, starting 1936 it had the seal of Commonwealth in red and in the "Victory" Series No. 66 in blue)

U.S. presidential appearances on other coins and currency around the world

The Bahamas 
In 1991, a 12-coin silver five-dollar series was issued in the Bahamas commemorating the 500th anniversary of European discovery of the Americas. Three of those coins showed images of U.S. presidents, with the coat of arms of the Bahamas on the obverse side.

Thomas Jefferson

 $5, 1991, silver, with Independence Hall – Declaration of Independence KM#143

Abraham Lincoln

 $5 1991, silver, with Abolition of Slavery KM#145

Theodore Roosevelt

 $5 1991, silver, with Panama Canal KM#149

Cook Islands 
Abraham Lincoln

 $50, 1990, silver, with United States Capitol dome KM#48

Thomas Jefferson

 $50, 1993, gold, KM#175

George Washington

 $50 1993, gold, KM#173

Cuba 
Abraham Lincoln

 1 Peso, 1993 1 peso, copper, commemorative, shows U.S.A (lower 48) and broken chains in background, Cuban shield on obverse. km#509

Isle of Man 
Dwight D. Eisenhower

 1 Crown, 1994

George Washington

 1 Crown, 1976 copper-nickel (KM#37) and a silver (KM#37a) commemorative, Bicentenary of American Independence, with Queen Elizabeth II on the obverse.
 In 1989, a four coin 1 crown set was issued in both copper-nickel and silver featuring the Bicentenary of George Washington's Presidential Inauguration.
 1 Crown, with James Monroe holding the flag – Washington Crossing the Delaware 1776
 copper-nickel KM#246, silver KM#246a
 1 Crown, (large portrait)
 copper-nickel KM#247, silver KM#247a
 1 Crown, (small portrait surrounded by a wreath containing eight stars and an eagle)
 copper-nickel KM#248, silver KM#248a
 1 Crown, taking the oath of office
 copper-nickel KM#249, silver KM#249a

Eleven presidents on one coin

 1987, 4 coin proof set, commemorating the Bicentenary of America's Constitution features the Statue of Liberty surrounded by these U.S. presidents in clockwise order; Thomas Jefferson, James Madison, George Washington, James Monroe, Abraham Lincoln, Ulysses S. Grant, Theodore Roosevelt, Franklin Roosevelt, Dwight Eisenhower, John F. Kennedy and Ronald Reagan
 1/2 Crown, gold, KM187
 1 Crown, copper-nickel, KM#176
 5 Crown, silver, KM#177
 10 Crowns, silver, KM#188

Liberia 
These are all commemoratives issued in Liberia featuring images of U.S. presidents with a Liberian arms symbol on the obverse side;

George H. W. Bush

 1989 inaugural series
 $10 silver KM#57
 $250 gold KM#58

George W. Bush

 $5 2001, inaugural, shows profile with Dick Cheney

Bill Clinton

 1993 inaugural series
 $5 silver KM#67
 $10 silver KM#68
 $50 silver KM#69
 $100 silver KM#70
 $250 gold KM#71

Dwight D. Eisenhower

 $10 1994, silver (25th anniversary of his death) KM#157

William H. Harrison

 $5 2000

John F. Kennedy

 1988 series 25th anniversary of death
 $10 silver KM#54
 $250 gold KM#52
 1993 series 30th anniversary of death
 $5 silver, KM#103
 $10 silver, KM#104
 $250 gold, KM#105
 $10 1999, silver In Memory of John F. Kennedy, Jr., conjoined busts similar to U.S. half dollar KM#424

Richard Nixon

 1996 series with Chairman Mao Zedong
 $1 copper-nickel, KM#255
 $5 silver, KM#261
 $10 silver, KM#262

Ronald Reagan

 1998 series with Abraham Lincoln statue
 $1 copper-nickel, KM#386
 $10 silver, KM#387
 $100 gold, KM#388

Franklin D. Roosevelt

 1995 portrait series
 $1 copper-nickel, KM#141
 $10 silver, KM#146
 $100 gold, KM#151
 1995 series, Cairo Conference, includes Winston Churchill and Chiang Kai-shek
 $1 copper-nickel, KM#164
 $10 silver, KM#165
 $100 gold, KM#166

Harry S Truman

 1995 series
 $1 copper-nickel, KM#143
 $10 silver, KM#148
 $100 gold, KM#153

Marshall Islands 
Dwight D. Eisenhower

 1990 series, saluting in uniform
 $5 copper-nickel, KM#38
 $50 silver, KM#39

John F. Kennedy

 $50 1995, silver, taking oath of office, KM#275

Niue 
Dwight D. Eisenhower

 1990 series, in uniform
 $5 copper-nickel, KM#29
 $50 silver, KM#30
 $200 gold, KM#45

John F. Kennedy

 1988 series, "Ich bin ein Berliner" quote
 $5 copper-nickel, KM#17
 $50 silver, KM#18
 $100 silver, KM#19
 $250 gold, KM#20
 $25 1994 (KM#79), 1997 (4 types, KM#82, 96, 97, 98), gold, taking oath of office
 $50 1993, gold, Apollo, KM#65
 $50 1993, gold, KM#66

Franklin D. Roosevelt

 1990 series "A date which will live in infamy" quote
 $5 copper-nickel,  KM#35
 $50 silver, KM#36
 $200 gold, KM#52

Paraguay 
John F. Kennedy
 1500 Guaranies, 1974, gold, KM#126
 3000 Guaranies, 1974, gold, KM#138
 4500 Guaranies, 1974, gold, KM#146

Abraham Lincoln

 3000 Guaranies, 1974, gold, KM#131

Turks and Caicos Islands 
Dwight D. Eisenhower

 5 Crowns, 1994, copper-nickel, 50th Anniversary – Normandy Landing, KM#176

Franklin Roosevelt

 20 Crowns, 1995, silver, with Churchill and Stalin, KM#137

George Washington

 1976 series, facing King George III – U.S. Bicentennial
 20 Crowns, silver, KM#13
 50 Crowns, gold, KM#15

United Arab Emirates 
Al-Fujairah
Richard Nixon

 2 Riyals, 1969 (AH1388), 1970 (AH1389), silver, KM#2
 25 Riyals, 1969 (AH1388), 1970 (AH1389), gold, KM#7

Ras al-Khaimah
Dwight D. Eisenhower

 10 Riyals, 1970, silver, memorial, KM#31

Sharjah
John F. Kennedy

 5 Rupees, 1965, silver, memorial, KM#1

Western Samoa 
Franklin D. Roosevelt
1981 series, sitting in wheelchair

 1 Tala, copper-nickel, KM#47
 10 Tala, silver, KM#48
 100 Tala, gold, KM#49

See also 

 Confederate States of America dollar
 List of people on banknotes
 List of people on stamps of the United States
 List of people on United States banknotes
 Presidential memorials in the United States
 United States dollar
 United States paper money
 Federal Reserve Bank Note
 Federal Reserve Note
 Gold Certificate
 National Bank Note
 Silver certificate (United States)
 United States Note

References

Bibliography

External links 
 usmint.gov: The U.S. Presidents on Our Coinage
Presidential Dollar Guide

United States Presidents
 Currency
United States presidents